Tyrone is a ghost town located in Grant County, New Mexico, United States, in the southwestern part of the state.

Description
Tyrone was an elaborately planned community financed by the Phelps Dodge Corporation, based on Mediterranean and European styles, designed by well-known architect Bertram Goodhue and built in 1915 at a cost of more than a million dollars. A drop in copper prices in 1921 closed the mines and the town was deserted. The townsite was later destroyed as part of Phelps Dodge's development of the Tyrone open-pit copper mine, which began operation in 1969.

See also

 List of ghost towns in New Mexico

References

Bibliography
 Haggard, C.J., "Reading the landscape: Phelps Dodge's Tyrone, New Mexico, in time and space {mining company town}," Journal of the West. 35:4, 29–39.

External links

 Tyrone ghost town page, with photographs
 Tyrone Mine at Freeport-McMoRan
 Geology of Tyrone Mine

Ghost towns in New Mexico
History of Grant County, New Mexico
Geography of Grant County, New Mexico